Live 2016 may refer to:
 Live 2016, live album by John Bramwell, released in 2017
Celine Live 2016 tour, concert tour by Celine Dion
Adele Live 2016, concert tour by Adele
Animelo Summer Live 2016 2016 in Japanese television